Nowy Widok  is a village in the administrative district of Gmina Kobiele Wielkie, within Radomsko County, Łódź Voivodeship, in central Poland.

The village has a population of 80.

References

Nowy Widok